A Briefer History of Time may refer either to:
A Briefer History of Time (Hawking and Mlodinow book) by Stephen Hawking and Leonard Mlodinow
A Briefer History of Time (Schulman book) by Eric Schulman

simple:A Brief History of Time#Other editions